Taboadela is a small municipality in the Province of Ourense in the Galicia region of north-west Spain.

References  

Municipalities in the Province of Ourense